In the first years after independence of Namibia in 1990, the Swakopmund council changed many of the original German and Afrikaans street names to honor former and current Namibian leaders. 

The move met the resistance of inhabitants who collected the old street name plaques to display them on their private properties, and painted the old street names on their houses. Particularly controversial was that some politicians instructed streets to be named after themselves, as Sam Nujoma did in 2001 and Libertine Amathila in 2002.

See also
List of renamed places in Namibia

References

Streets, former
Swakopmund streets, former
Swakopmund streets, former
Swakopmund, former
Swakopmund streets, former
Swakopmund